Sakoa is a region of southwestern Madagascar characterised by dry spiny forest and known particularly for its coal fields, the highest quality of which is the Sakoa field. There are a number of license holders on the field. The vast majority of licenses of commercial value are held by Madagascar Consolidated Mining, a subsidiary of Red Island Minerals, founded by Sam Malin, which is appraising and developing the resources of the field. Pan African Mining holds a considerable number of licenses on the periphery of the field. Other coal fields adjacent to the Sakoa region include the Ianapera, Imaloto, Sakamena and Vohibory fields.

Sources 

WWF Dry Forest Programme

References
 David Hilling, Alternative Energy Sources for Africa: Potential and Prospects, African Affairs, Vol. 75, No. 300 (Jul., 1976), pp. 359-371 Alternative Energy Sources for Africa: Potential and Prospects

Regions of Madagascar
Geography of Madagascar